Brodmann area 34 is a part of the brain.

It has been described as part of the entorhinal area and the superior temporal gyrus.

The entorhinal area is the main interface between the hippocampus and neocortex and involved in memory, navigation and the perception of time. 
Destruction of Brodmann area 34 results in ipsilateral anosmia.

See also

 Brodmann area

References

34
Olfactory system
Temporal lobe
Medial surface of cerebral hemisphere